The Glacier Wind Farm spans southwest Glacier County and southeast Toole County in northern Montana.   With a total generating capacity of 210 megawatts (MW), it became the largest wind farm in the state when the second construction phase came online at the end of 2009.  A portion of the electricity is purchased by San Diego Gas and Electric.

Facility details

The facility is located off of U.S. Highway 2 south of the unincorporated community of Ethridge, between the cities of Cut Bank and Shelby, and spans about 25,000 acres.  It was constructed in two phases by Mortenson Construction,  starting with a groundbreaking celebration in July 2007. The completed facility consists of 140 wind turbines and their foundations, electrical substations, maintenance buildings, access roads, underground collection lines, and overhead transmission lines. 

Phase I entered service in October 2008 and uses 71 Acciona 1.7 MW turbines.  Phase II came online in October 2009 and uses an additional 69 Acciona 1.7 MW turbines.   The 189 MW Rim Rock Wind Farm was subsequently completed about 15 miles to the north in 2012. In addition to the hundreds of construction jobs and millions of dollars in cumulative land lease payments and tax revenues,  about 10-15 permanent local jobs were also created to maintain the facilities over their lifetime.

The project was originally developed by Great Plain Wind & Energy LLC.  The Spanish company NaturEner, in partnership with Morgan Stanley, purchased the project in 2006, financed the construction, and continues to own and operate the facility.  Performance is continuously monitored from its operations center in San Francisco.

Electricity production 

(*) partial year of operation

See also

Wind power in Montana
List of wind farms in the United States

References

External links
Glacier Wind Project

Energy infrastructure completed in 2008
Energy infrastructure completed in 2009
Wind farms in Montana
Buildings and structures in Glacier County, Montana
Buildings and structures in Toole County, Montana